WPAL may refer to:

 WPAL (FM), a radio station (90.5 FM) licensed to serve Laceyville, Pennsylvania, United States; see List of radio stations in Pennsylvania
 WCOZ (FM), a radio station (91.7 FM) licensed to serve New Albany, Pennsylvania, which held the call sign WPAL from 2011 to 2017
 WLTQ (AM) (formerly WPAL), an AM radio station once located in Charleston, South Carolina 
 WAYA-FM (formerly WPAL-FM), an FM radio station licensed to Ridgeville, South Carolina
 Wikipedia:WikiProject Alabama